Mohamed Nakdali (born 15 February 1962) is a Syrian former wrestler who competed in the 1980 Summer Olympics and in the 1984 Summer Olympics.

References

External links
 

1962 births
Living people
Olympic wrestlers of Syria
Wrestlers at the 1980 Summer Olympics
Wrestlers at the 1984 Summer Olympics
Syrian male sport wrestlers
20th-century Syrian people